The Yishui River, also known as Yi River, is a right-bank tributary of the middle Xiang River in Hunan, China. It is the largest and longest river in Changning City. The Yi River rises in Xiaoyangquan of Baishui Township of Guiyang County. Its main stream runs generally south to north and joins the Xiang at Jiangkoutang of Xinhe Town.

References

Rivers of Hunan